Rubus geoides is a South American species of flowering plant in the rose family. It has been found only in the extreme southern part of the continent, in the Provinces of Tierra del Fuego, Santa Cruz, Río Negro, and Neuquén in Argentina, the adjacent Magallanes Region of Chile, and the Falkland Islands.

Rubus geoides is a very small, spineless, trailing herb rarely more than 10 cm tall. It has trifoliate leaves.

References

External links
 photo of herbarium specimen at Missouri Botanical Garden, collected in southern Chile circa 1828
 

geoides
Plants described in 1789
Flora of Argentina
Flora of Chile